Ivan Lendl was the defending champion but lost in the second round to Grant Connell.

Stefan Edberg won in the final 6–2, 6–3 against David Wheaton.

Seeds
The top eight seeds received a bye to the second round.

  Stefan Edberg (champion)
  Ivan Lendl (second round)
  Pete Sampras (second round)
  Michael Chang (quarterfinals)
  Derrick Rostagno (second round)
  David Wheaton (final)
  Anders Järryd (semifinals)
  Todd Woodbridge (third round)
  Kevin Curren (second round)
  Eric Jelen (second round)
  Mats Wilander (first round)
  Wally Masur (first round)
  Scott Davis (first round)
  Todd Witsken (second round)
  Veli Paloheimo (first round)
  Mark Woodforde (first round)

Draw

Finals

Top half

Section 1

Section 2

Bottom half

Section 3

Section 4

External links
 1991 Stella Artois Championships draw

Singles